Hálan may refer to:

 Hálan (Punjab), an ethnic group of the Punjab
 Hálan, Pt Br, a village in Kermanshah Province, Iran

See also